Winner(s) or The Winner(s) may refer to:

 Champion, the victor in a game or contest
The successful social class in winner and loser culture

Film 
 The Winner (1926 film), an American silent film starring Billy Sullivan
 The Winner (1962 film), a French film by François Reichenbach
 The Winners (1973 film) or My Way, a South African film
 The Winner (1995 film), a Chinese film by Huo Jianqi
 The Winner (1996 film), an American comedy by Alex Cox
 Winner (2003 film), an Indian Tamil film starring Prashanth
 The Winner (2011 film), an American-Polish co-production by Wiesław Saniewski
 The Winner (2014 film), a Hungarian film by Dávid Géczy
 The Winner (2016 film), a Nepalese action film
 Winner (2017 film), an Indian Telugu film
 Winners (2022 film), a British Persian-language drama film

Television 
 Winners (1977 TV series), a 1977 American TV series
 Winners (American TV series), a 1991 American TV series
 Winners (Australian TV series), a 1985 anthology television series
 The Winner (TV series), a 2007 American TV comedy series
 The Winners, two Australian rules football highlight TV show
 "Winner" (Better Call Saul), the final episode of the fourth season of Better Call Saul
 "The Winner", an episode of The Brady Bunch
 "The Winner", an episode of Welcome to Paradox

Literature 
 The Winner (novel), a novel by David Baldacci
 Winners (collection), a collection of short stories by Poul Anderson
 The Winners (novel) (Los premios), a novel by Julio Cortázar
 Winner (newspaper), a sports newspaper in Australia between 1914 and 1917

Music 
 The Winner Records, a UK record label
 Winner (band), a K-pop boy band

Albums 
 Winner (Renée Geyer album) (1978)
 Winner (Big Boss Man album), a 2005 album by Big Boss Man
 Winners (Brothers Johnson album) (1981)
 Winners (Kleeer album) (1979)

Songs 
 "Winner" (Jamie Foxx song)
 "Winner" (Kid British song)
 "Winner" (Pet Shop Boys song)
 "Winner" (Rythem song)
 "Winner" (Systems in Blue song)
 "Winner", by Karina Pasian from First Love
 "The Winner", by Badfinger (written by Joey Molland) from Ass
 "The Winner", by Badfinger (written by Joe Tansin) from Airwaves
 "The Winner", by Bobby Bare
 "Winner", by Chris Brown from Chris Brown
 "The Winner", by Coolio from the Space Jam film soundtrack
 "The Winner", by The Crystal Method from Tweekend
 "The Winner", by Status Quo from Quid Pro Quo
 "Winner", by Stephanie Mills from Stephanie

Places 
 Winner, Minnesota, an abandoned townsite
 Winner, Missouri, an unincorporated community
 Winner, South Dakota, a city

Other uses 
 Winner (card game), a shedding card game
 Winner (surname), a family name
 Winners, a Canadian retail chain
 Ligat Winner, an Israeli basketball league
 Imidacloprid or Winner, an insecticide
 Barry Horowitz or The Winner, professional wrestler 
 Winner (tennis), a forcing shot

See also
 Win (disambiguation)
 Winning (disambiguation)